There are several astronomical catalogues referred to as Nebulae and Star Clusters.

A Nebula is a cloud of dust and gas inside a galaxy. Nebulae become visible if the gas glows, or if the cloud reflects starlight or obscures light from more distant objects.

The catalogues that it may refer to:

 Catalogue des nébuleuses et des amas d'étoiles (Messier "M" catalogue) first published 1771
 Catalogue of Nebulae and Clusters of Stars (William Herschel 'CN'/"H" catalogue) first published 1786
 General Catalogue of Nebulae and Clusters of Stars (John Herschel 'GC'/"h" catalogue) first published 1864
 New General Catalogue of Nebulae and Clusters of Stars (Dreyer "NGC" catalogue) first published 1888
 Index Catalogue of Nebulae and Clusters of Stars (JLE Dreyer's "IC" catalogue)

See also
 Nebula, a type of celestial body
 Galaxy, a type of celestial body formerly referred to as nebulae
 Star cluster or cluster of stars, a type of celestial body

 Lists of books
 Astronomical catalogues